Matthew or Matt Myers may refer to: 
 Matthew Myers (cricketer)
 Matthew Myers (judge)
 Matthew Myers (ice hockey)
 Matt Myers (baseball)
 Matt Myers (wrestler)